Vaidotas Žala (born ) is a Lithuanian rally and rally-raid driver. Žala won the Lithuanian Rally Champion winning the title in 2019 and 2020, both when driving for Agrorodeo racing team with Škoda Fabia R5. In addition to participating in various classic rally events Žala has been participating in Dakar Rally since 2016 with his start in 2021 being his 6th consecutive start at the Rally-raid marathon. Žala is also the first Lithuanian to win a stage in Dakar Rally. Žala finished first in the opening stage of 2020 Dakar Rally.

Rally racing record

Rally Starts 
  {| class="wikitable" style="font-size: 90%; text-align: center;"
! Year !! 2011 !! 2012 !! 2013 !! 2014 !! 2015 !! 2016 !! 2017 !! 2018 !! 2019 !! 2020
|-
| align=left|  Lithuanian Rally Championship || 6 || 5 || 7 || 4 || 6 || 5 || 3 || 4 || 6 || 4
|-
| align=left|  Latvian Rally Championship || 3 ||  ||  ||  ||  ||  ||  ||  || 2 || 
|-
| align=left|  Estonian Rally Championship || 1 ||  ||  ||  ||  ||  ||  ||  ||  || 
|-
| align=left|  Belarus Rally Championship ||  ||  || 4 ||  ||  ||  ||  ||  ||  || 
|-
| align=left|  Norway Rally Championship ||  ||  ||  || 1 ||  ||  ||  ||  ||  || 
|-
| align=left|  European Rally Championship ||  ||  ||  ||  ||  ||  ||  ||  || 2 || 
|-
| align=left|  NEZ Rally Championship ||  ||  ||  ||  || 1 ||  ||  ||  ||  || 
|}

Rally Victories 

 {| class="wikitable" style="font-size: 90%;"
!#
!Event
!Season
!Co-driver
!Car
|-
|1
| Rally Ozerniy Kray 2013
|2013
| Dainius Alekna
|Subaru Impreza STi N12
|-
|2
| Rally Classic Druskininkai 2014
|2014
| Žygimantas Žala
|Subaru Impreza STi N12
|-
|3
| Rally Elektrėnai 2015
|2015
| Žygimantas Žala
|Mitsubishi Lancer Evo IX
|-
|4
| Rally Classic Druskininkai 2015
|2015
| Žygimantas Žala
|Mitsubishi Lancer Evo IX
|-
|5
| 300 Lakes Rally
|2016
| Žygimantas Žala
|Mitsubishi Lancer Evo IX
|-
|6
| Rally Žemaitija
|2018
| Andris Mālnieks
|Škoda Fabia R5
|-
|7
| Samsonas Rally Rokiškis
|2018
| Andris Mālnieks
|Škoda Fabia R5
|-
|-
|8
| Rally Classic 2018
|2018
| Andris Mālnieks
|Škoda Fabia R5
|-
|9
| Rally Žemaitija 2019
|2019
| Andris Mālnieks
|Škoda Fabia R5
|-
|10
| Rally Elektrėnai 2019
|2019
| Andris Mālnieks
|Škoda Fabia R5
|-
|11
| Samsonas Rally Rokiškis 2019
|2019
| Andris Mālnieks
|Škoda Fabia R5
|-
|12
| Rally Classic 2019
|2019
| Andris Mālnieks
|Škoda Fabia R5
|-
|13
| Rally Žemaitija 2020
|2020
| Andris Mālnieks
|Škoda Fabia R5
|-
|14
| Rally Elektrėnai 2020
|2020
| Andris Mālnieks
|Škoda Fabia R5
|}

Championship Victories 

Žala won Lithuanian Rally Championship title in 2019 and in 2020 Assisted by his co-driver Andris Mālnieks, Žala came first with his Škoda Fabia R5 in LARČ 1 as well as 4WD classes.

Dakar Results 
Žala has been regular participant in the Dakar Rally since making his debut in 2016. Žala and his co-driver Saulius Jurgelėnas failed to finish in 2016 and 2017 due to mechanical issues with their Lithuanian-built prototype rally car based on Seat platform. Žala's best result to date is 11th place finish in 2022. In 2020 Žala made history by winning the opening stage, and thus becoming the first Lithuanian to win a Dakar Rally stage. 

 {| class="wikitable" style="font-size: 90%;"
|+
!Year
!Class
!Starting number
!Co-Driver
!Vehicle
!Position
|-
|2016
| style="text-align:center;"|Car
| style="text-align:center;"|390
| Saulius Jurgelėnas
|  Seat Leon Dakar (aka Bitė)
| style="text-align:center;"|DNF (10/13)
|-
|2017
| style="text-align:center;"|Car
| style="text-align:center;"|373
| Saulius Jurgelėnas
|  Seat Leon Dakar (aka Bitė)
| style="text-align:center;"|DNF (4/12)
|-
|2018
| style="text-align:center;"|Car
| style="text-align:center;"|349
| Saulius Jurgelėnas
| Toyota Hilux Overdrive OTB (aka Kamanė)
| style="text-align:center;"|18
|-
|2019
| style="text-align:center;"|Car
| style="text-align:center;"|337
| Saulius Jurgelėnas
| Toyota Hilux Overdrive OTB (aka Kamanė)
| style="text-align:center;"|12
|-
|2020
| style="text-align:center;"|Car
| style="text-align:center;"|319
| Saulius Jurgelėnas
| Mini John Cooper Works Rally (aka Mažylis)
| style="text-align:center;"| 26
|-
|2021
| style="text-align:center;"|Car
| style="text-align:center;"|325
| Paulo Fiuza
| Mini John Cooper Works Rally (aka Mažylis)
| style="text-align:center;"|DNF (2/12)
|-
|2022
| style="text-align:center;"|Car
| style="text-align:center;"|234
| Paulo Fiuza
| Mini John Cooper Works Rally (aka Mažylis)
| style="text-align:center;"|11
|-
|2023
| style="text-align:center;"|Car
| style="text-align:center;"|213
| Paulo Fiuza
| Prodrive BRX Hunter
| style="text-align:center;"| DNF (12/14)
|}

References 

Lithuanian racing drivers
Living people
1987 births
Dakar Rally drivers